Toconce is a small Chilean village located on the south rim of the Toconce River Canyon at 3,350 m above sea level. To the north, the landscape is dominated by the volcanoes Cerro Paniri, Cerro del León and Toconce.

See also
Ayquina
Caspana
Salado River

References

Populated places in El Loa Province